Leon D. Young (born July 4, 1967) is a police officer and former Democratic member of the Wisconsin State Assembly, representing the 16th Assembly District from 1992 until 2018.

Gaining office 
In 1992, his aunt, incumbent Marcia P. Coggs (18th District), waited until just hours before the deadline for filing nomination papers to announce her retirement. Only one potential competitor had time to file nomination papers, since no challengers had planned to file against Coggs for the Democratic nomination (tantamount to election in this heavily-African-American, reliably Democratic district). (Wisconsin's statutes have been changed to prevent such a surprise being repeated.) Young was elected to his aunt's seat and has been re-elected ever since.

In 2018, Young announced that he was retiring from politics, and that he intended to resume working as a police officer.

References

External links
Wisconsin Assembly - Representative Leon D. Young official government website (archived
 
Map of the 16th district as created by the Federal Court Redistricting Decision dated May 22, 2002, effective as of May 30, 2002
Follow the Money - Leon D. Young
2008 2006 2004 2002 2000 1998 campaign contributions
Campaign 2008 campaign contributions at Wisconsin Democracy Campaign
Leon Young Faces Three Challengers in the 16th District Lisa Kaiser, Express.com, August 20, 2008
Eisen, Marc. "In Dubious Battle: WORST LEGISLATORS." "An inevitable bottom-dweller in Milwaukee Magazine’s periodic legislative surveys, Young, 41, remains the worst of the worst after 16 years in the Assembly." Milwaukee Magazine, January 2009
Kane, Eugene. "Rep. Leon Young hasn’t taken visible stance on many issues" Milwaukee Journal Sentinel, Sept 11, 2008

1967 births
African-American state legislators in Wisconsin
American police officers
Living people
Democratic Party members of the Wisconsin State Assembly
21st-century American politicians
21st-century African-American politicians
20th-century African-American people